Maltecora janthina is an endemic jumping spider species of the family Salticidae that lives on São Tomé Island. It was first named in 1910 by Eugène Simon.

Its male holotype measures 5 mm.

References

Endemic fauna of São Tomé Island
Salticidae
Spiders of Africa
Spiders described in 1910